Chan Oi Ni (born 15 May 1966) is a Hong Kong badminton player. She competed in mixed doubles at the 1996 Summer Olympics in Atlanta.

References

External links

1966 births
Living people
Hong Kong female badminton players
Olympic badminton players of Hong Kong
Badminton players at the 1996 Summer Olympics
Badminton players at the 1994 Asian Games
Asian Games competitors for Hong Kong
Medallists at the 1994 Commonwealth Games
Commonwealth Games bronze medallists for Hong Kong
Commonwealth Games medallists in badminton